Passenger is the third album by Danish industrial metal band Mnemic, and their first to feature vocalist Guillaume Bideau (formerly of Scarve).

Originally, mixing duties were to be handled by Andy Sneap, but the band later decided to have Tue Madsen (producer and mixer on both previous albums) mix instead. Christian Olde Wolbers from Fear Factory also did co-production work for this album. Since this album, the guitarists use downtuned 7-string guitars.

To promote the album, the band went on a tour of North America in January and February 2007 with God Forbid, Goatwhore, Arsis, The Human Abstract, and Byzantine and on a tour of the UK with the Deftones in March.

Track listing

Personnel
 Guillaume Bideau – vocals
 Mircea Gabriel Eftemie – guitar, keyboards
 Rune Stigart – guitar, keyboards
 Tomas Koefoed – bass
 Brian Rasmussen – drums

References 

Nuclear Blast albums
2007 albums
Mnemic albums